Prince Leopold (1813–1817) was a British Thoroughbred racehorse and winner of the 1816 Epsom Derby. Prince Leopold was bred by the Duke of York and raced as a three and four-year-old. The bay colt had an unruly temperament, and was castrated at the end of the 1817 racing season in an attempt to improve his behavior, but he died shortly after the procedure.

Background
Prince Leopold was bred by the Duke of York and was foaled at the Duke's Oakland Park stud in 1813. His sire, Hedley (foaled in 1803), raced at age four and five, winning a few 100-guinea races before he retired to stud in Wingfield, Berkshire in 1809. Prince Leopold was Hedley's most notable son. Gramarie (foaled 1807), Prince Leopold's dam, was also bred by the Duke of York and produced a full-sister to Prince Leopold, Leopoldine, that became the tail-female ancestress of several French stakes winners, most notably Bois Roussel. Gramarie also produced Bella Donna, the granddam of Derby winner Amato.

Racing career and death
Prince Leopold did not race as a two-year-old, and he started seven times in his three-year career with a total of two wins and one "walk over" (win by default). The colt's most important win was in the Derby, and the Duke of York won the Derby a second time in 1822 with the colt Moses. The Duke of York's racing establishment was managed by the Duke's groom, Warwick Lake, and Prince Leopold was registered under Lake's name for most of his racing engagements.

1816: three-year-old season
The 1,575-guinea Derby was held on 30 May with 11 horses lining up for the start. The race favorite was the colt Nectar who had won the 2,000 Guineas Stakes. In the final strides of the race, Nectar and Prince Leopold battled for the win, with Prince Leopold winning by half a length. The Duke of York reportedly won several thousand pounds by betting on Prince Leopold to win the Derby.

On 1 October at the First October meeting at Newmarket, Prince Leopold was third in the St. Leger Stakes being beaten by the colts Sovereign and Sir Richard. The next day, Prince Leopold received 125 guineas after a subscription race did not attract enough entries (termed as a "walk over"). On 17 October at the Second October meeting, Prince Leopold was fourth in the second class of the October Oatlands Stakes where the winner was his sire's five-year-old full-brother Wanderer.

1817: four-year-old season and death
At the Newmarket-Craven meeting, Prince Leopold won the Port Stakes out of a field of five horses. At the First Spring meeting at Newmarket, Prince Leopold was beaten by Mr. Wyndham's colt Skim in a match race. On 5 May at Newmarket, Nectar beat Prince Leopold in a match race, and he finished third in a 150-guinea sweepstakes race at the same meeting a few days later.

Towards the end of the 1817 racing season, Prince Leopold's "temper being so bad they could do nothing with him," the decision was made to castrate him. The General Stud Book reports that Prince Leopold died after the operation in 1817, but the Sporting Magazine lists his death year as 1818. The 1817 Racing Calendar reports that Lord Stawell's horse Pandour received a forfeit from Prince Leopold (listed as dead) on 29 September 1817, making the 1817 death date more likely.

Pedigree

References

1813 racehorse births
1817 racehorse deaths
Epsom Derby winners
Racehorses trained in the United Kingdom
Thoroughbred family 2-a